Gail Pavliga is the state representative for the 75th District of the Ohio House of Representatives. She is a Republican. Prior to joining politics, Pavliga was a counsellor and adjunct professor at Malone University.

Early life
Pavliga earned her bachelor's degree in Psychology/Science and master's degree in Individual/Family Studies/Counseling from Kent State University before enrolling at the University of Akron for her PhD in Educational Psychology.

Personal life
Pavliga and her husband Frank have two children together, Katie and Steve.

References

External links

Living people
Republican Party members of the Ohio House of Representatives
21st-century American politicians
University of Akron alumni
Kent State University alumni
Year of birth missing (living people)